Lakhau is a village in Sibsagar district, Assam, India.

Villages in Sivasagar district